Konakondla is a very big village in Vajrakarur  Taluk near to Guntakal in Anantapur district, Andhra Pradesh, India.

It is believed that this village was once famous for Jainism and Buddhism. There is some historical evidence in and around the village.
From ancient times, this place has produced many gems and diamonds.

Almost 30000 people are living in konakondla. People's are celebrating utla teru on every year.

Jainism 
Konakondla is considered to be birthplace of one of the most influential digambara Jain monks, Kundakunda.

References 

Villages in Anantapur district